Empress Mingde may refer to:

Empress Ma (Han dynasty) (40–79), wife of Emperor Ming of Han
Empress Qiang (died 356), wife of Former Qin's founding emperor Fu Jian
Empress Mingde (Song dynasty) (960–1004), wife of Emperor Taizong of Song
Lady Wulinda (died 1152), wife of Emperor Shizong of Jin before his coronation